4th Armoured Brigade may refer to:
4th Armoured Brigade (Australia)
4th Armoured Brigade (United Kingdom), 1939–1945
4th New Zealand Armoured Brigade
4th Canadian Armoured Brigade